Dahiyat Qudsaya is a modern suburb adjacent to the town of Qudsaya and just north of the Mezzeh district of Damascus in Syria. The village is administratively part of the Qudsaya District of the Rif Dimashq Governorate in southern Syria. Nearby localities include al-Hamah to the north, and the affluent suburbs of al-Sabboura and Yaafour to the west. According to the Syria Central Bureau of Statistics, Dahiyat Qudsaya had a population of 9,500 in the 2004 census.

References

Populated places in Qudsaya District